Chapin House may refer to:

Philip Chapin House, New Hartford, Connecticut
Horatio Chapin House, South Bend, Indiana
A. Chapin House, Uxbridge, Massachusetts
Henry A. Chapin House, Niles, Michigan
Thaddeus Chapin House, Canandaigua, New York